Akuliaruseq may refer to the following landforms in Greenland, from north to south:

 Akuliaruseq Island, an island in the southern part of Upernavik Archipelago
 Akuliaruseq Peninsula, a mainland peninsula in the Uummannaq Fjord region
 Akuliaruseq, Kujalleq, a village of Kujalleq municipality
 Akuliaruseq (mountain), a mountain in Greenland